Adam Casey may refer to:

 Adam Casey (soccer) (born 1986), Australian footballer
 Adam Casey (curler) (born 1989), Canadian curler
 Adam M. Casey, cancer survivor and founder of the non-profit I Do It For Her